Things Like These is an EP by New Zealand band Breathe, released in 1995.

Track listing
Prayer
White
ll I Know
Candy Girl
Dive Tower

Breathe (New Zealand band) albums
1995 EPs